The Williams College Investment Office is the subsidiary office of Williams College responsible for managing the College's endowment of over US $4.2 billion. The Office is located in Boston, Massachusetts. Its Chief Investment Officer is Collette Chilton.

Founding 
In 2006, Williams College established the Investment Office to manage the endowment. In the early 2000s, the endowment had exceeded US $1 billion and the College decided more complex investment management was required to continue to grow the fund. The College hired Collette Chilton as Chief Investment Officer and set up an office in Boston, Massachusetts.

Organization and structure 
The Investment Office has a staff of nine people who directly oversee the management of the College's portfolio. Advising the staff are three Advisory Committees, made up of Williams alumni or parents with financial expertise. Overseeing all is the Investment Committee, consisting of eight members, who is finally responsible for the Investment Pool.

On the staff level, the Chief Investment Officer remains Collette Chilton. The Co-Chairs of the Marketable Assets Advisory Committee are Ole Andreas Halvorsen and Elizabeth Robinson. The Co-Chairs of the Non-Marketable Assets Advisory Committee are Timothy Barrows and Jonathan Sokoloff. The Co-Chairs of the Real Assets Advisory Committee are John Foster and Robert Pinkard. The Chair of the Investment Committee is Jonathan Kraft.

Investment strategy 
The Investment Office does not directly invest in any stocks. Rather, the staff hires managers to invest the different assets in the portfolio. There are ten asset classes: global long equity, global long/short equity, absolute return, venture capital, buyouts, real assets, real estate, investment grade fixed income, non-investment grade fixed income, and cash. The Office has a long-term return objective of 5% plus inflation. Overall, the Investment Office had a rate of return of -1.5% in the 2016 fiscal year, and an overall annual return of 7.3% for the ten years since the office was established.

References

Williams College
Financial endowments